Ramaul  is a village in Siraha Municipality in Siraha District in the Madhesh Province of south-eastern Nepal. It is surrounded by Makhanaha from the east side, Basbitta from the north-west side, Manpur from the south-west side, Madar from the south-north side and Kamala River from the west side.  At the time of the 1991 Nepal census it had a population of 5000 people living in 400 individual households. Before it was under the Village development committee, of Siraha Nepal in 1991 Nepal census. Now it lies under the Siraha Municipality-3,4, and 5. It is divided into five areas (Tolas): Purab Tola (East Area), Uttar Tola (North Area), Paschim Tola (West Area), Dakshin Tola (South-West Area), and Mansoori Tola (South-East Area). It is a Muslim-dominated village with a population of around 20000-25000. The ward commissioner of Siraha Municipality from Ward No 4 is Mohammad SHAMSHAD ALAM . And the ward commissioner of siraha municipality from ward No.5 is JAGESHWAR YADAV .Both of them took office on 30 May 2022. His predecessor ward commissioner of Siraha Municipality from Ward No 4 was Sheikh Haji Izharul Haque .And From ward No.5 was SULINDRA . Both of them took office on 25 September 2017 and their last date of work was on May 29, 2022.

Some Information
It has 6 Madrasah, in which Islamic teaching is taught, two private schools, of which one is secondary school and the other is lower secondary school, two government schools.  It has 10 Masjid (Mosque). It is from Siraha headquarters. The Kamla River, which flows from Nepal to India touches Ramaul from the West Area.

Educational Institute
Secondary School, Ramaul, Siraha-04, Nepal
Nepal Avalanche Academy, Ramaul, Siraha-05, Nepal
Madarasa Arabiya Makhjunool Uloom Assalfiya, Ramaul (East), Siraha-04, Nepal
Madarsa Hussainiya, Ramaul (North), Siraha-04, Nepal
Madarsa Darrutalim wa tarbiyat, Ramaul (South-West), Siraha-05, Nepal
Madarsa Sultanul-uloom Ramaul (West), Siraha-04, Nepal
Madarasa Almahadul Ilmi Assalafi, Ramaul (South), Siraha, Nepal
 Al madrasatul Muhammadiyatus salafiyah, Ramaul (South), Siraha, Nepal

Mosque
Jama Masjid, Ramaul (East), Siraha-04, Nepal
Makki Masjid, Ramaul (North), Siraha-04, Nepal
Madni Masjid, Ramaul (North), Siraha-04, Nepal
Masjid-e-Belal, Ramaul (West), Siraha-04, Nepal
Jama Masjid Ahle Hadith, Ramaul (South-East), Siraha, Nepal
Makki Masjid, Ramaul (South), Siraha, Nepal

References

External links
UN map of the municipalities of Siraha District

Populated places in Siraha District